Auchenipterus is a genus of driftwood catfishes (order Siluriformes).

Taxonomy
The genus is hypothesized to be monophyletic, diagnosed by the shared presence of grooves in the ventral surface of the head that accommodate adducted mental barbels. The presence of papillae on the dorsal and medial surface of the ossified maxillary barbel of mature males is also a possible synapomorphy, but in three species this cannot be confirmed as there are no adult male specimens yet discovered.

This genus contains 11 species:
Auchenipterus ambyiacus Fowler, 1915
Auchenipterus brachyurus (Cope, 1878)
Auchenipterus brevior C. H. Eigenmann, 1912
Auchenipterus britskii Ferraris & Vari, 1999
Auchenipterus demerarae C. H. Eigenmann, 1912
Auchenipterus dentatus Valenciennes, 1840
Auchenipterus fordicei C. H. Eigenmann & R. S. Eigenmann, 1888
Auchenipterus menezesi Ferraris & Vari, 1999
Auchenipterus nigripinnis (Boulenger, 1895)
Auchenipterus nuchalis (Spix & Agassiz, 1829)
Auchenipterus osteomystax (A. Miranda-Ribeiro, 1918)

Distribution
The neotropical genus Auchenipterus is widely distributed in most of the river systems east of the Andean Cordilleras. The species are found through the Orinoco River, Amazon River, and Rio de La Plata basins, and the coastal drainages of the Guianas; one species, A. menezesi, originates from the Rio Pindark-Mirim and Rio Parnaiba basins of northeastern Brazil. In some regions they are abundant enough to be commercially important.

Description

Auchenipterus species have a number of pronounced sexually dimorphic features of the head, maxillary barbels, and anal fin.

References

Auchenipteridae
Fish of the Amazon basin
Fish of Brazil
Catfish genera
Taxa named by Achille Valenciennes